St. Anne's Road Pocket Park is a pocket park measuring 120 meters squared (0.03 acres) located off St. Anne's Road in the northside Dublin suburb of Drumcondra. The park, measuring only 40-metres long and between six to one metre wide at its narrowest point, is backed by the wall of Drumcondra railway station to its north. The park is a part of Dublin City Council's Public Participation Network (PPN).

History
The idea for the pocket park was conceived by Jen Martin, a resident of St. Anne's Road, in 2014. At that time the narrow, triangular space had been used as a space for "little more than public urination", set as it is off the main Dorset Street - Drumcondra corridor and in the vicinity of Croke Park stadium which sees high volumes of pedestrian traffic on a regular basis. The site had also been previously suggested as a site for a bottle bank, but this idea had been turned down some years before.

Martin applied for a grant from the Croke Park Community Fund in January 2014, and with the proceeds employed landscape architect Sophie Graefin von Maltzan to develop the corner into something which could be more beneficial to the community. The park was largely built in spring 2016 by the Drumcondra community. Siobhan Maher, Dublin City Council’s Public-Realm Strategy Project Manager, also helped to facilitate the project. Speaking in February 2020, Maher said "While there used to be issues with antisocial behaviour in the space, it’s been transformed into a very cared for, positive space in the area".

Status
As of 2022, some residents had commented on the positive role the park played during the COVID-19 pandemic, allowing a place for them to meet neighbours at an outdoor focal point and for new arrivals to settle in to the area. The park is south facing, and during the COVID-19 lockdowns and travel restrictions also allowed local people a space in which to "enjoy the sun". Local residents have commended the park, however small, for its open space, biodiversity and for allowing an area for people to enjoy nature in a city centre environment very close to a busy road. At Christmas time, the park has been decorated with lights, and every year the residents throw a birthday party for the park. Volunteers also held an event in the park on Culture Night 2019.

Maintenance of the park is managed by Dublin City Council (DCC) as well as the local residents. DCC cuts the grass, but all other work is done by the users of the park. In January 2021 the park was included in an Irish Times article named "11 ways to reinvigorate Dublin city centre - Outdoor pools, pocket parks, and small-business support among the possibilities".

Biodiversity
The park has been called a "perfect example for introducing more green infrastructure into the city and a micro green infrastructure stepping stone if you look at the rich habitat it creates". A number of insects, animals and flora are based in the park, including quercus robur, fuchsia, aphids, honey bees, bumblebees, hoverflies, passiflora edulis, millipedes, centipedes, woodlice, jacobaea vulgaris, plantago lanceolata as well as two-spot, ten-spot and 22-spot ladybirds.

Developments
The community who maintain and use the park aim to make it into an even better version of what it is now. As a spokesperson in the official Dublin City Public Participation Network video explained, "We'd very much like to improve the playfulness of the park, because really this is a park for older people to come and sit and take a rest, and for kids to come and play, and everyone in between".

Another pocket park that has been developed in Dublin city is Montpelier Gardens, Stoneybatter which was set up in May 2022 as part of DCC's greening strategy.

References

Parks in Dublin (city)